The cocktail bun is a Hong Kong-style sweet bun with a filling of shredded coconut. It is one of several iconic types of baked goods originating from Hong Kong.

History
The cocktail bun is said to have been created in the 1950s in Hong Kong, when the proprietors of a bakery resisted the wasteful disposal of unsold but perfectly edible buns. The solution was to incorporate these buns into a new product to be sold fresh. The day-old buns were ground up, with sugar and coconut added in, to create a tasty filling mixture; fresh bread dough was wrapped around this mixture to make the first filled "cocktail bun".

Its name is said to have come from comparing the baker's mixture of hodgepodge of ingredients to a bartender's exotic mixture of alcoholic liquors, both formulating a "cocktail". The Chinese name is a literal translation of "cocktail", and is called a "chicken-tail bun".

Production
Originally, the filling was made of blending day-old buns with granulated sugar. Newer versions saw the addition of shredded coconut and butter or margarine to the recipe, which are now key ingredients in the cocktail bun filling. Each bun is approximately 6 to 8 inches long and 2 to 3 inches high in the shape of a small baguette. The cocktail bun can be found in many Chinese bakeries along with other popular sweet buns like the pineapple bun, which also originated from Hong Kong.

Texture
The bun itself is soft, pliable and lightly sweet, typical of Hong Kong-style breads. The coconut-based filling is dense and has a rich, buttery and sweet flavour. A final egg wash to the exterior lends a shiny, golden-brown color to the tops, which are further decorated with stripes or other simple designs using some of the buttery coconut filling, and often finished with a sprinkling of sesame seeds.

The Taiwanese version of the cocktail bun is slightly firmer than its Hong Kong counterpart, but still maintains the same filling and sesame seed dusting.

See also
 List of buns
 List of stuffed dishes

References

External links
 

Hong Kong breads
Sweet breads
Foods containing coconut
Chinese breads
Buns
Stuffed desserts